The Colt Ace or Colt Service Model Ace is a firearm that was designed to allow inexpensive and low-recoil practice while maintaining the feel of the military Model 1911 pistol.

History
While the Colt 1911 was chambered in the powerful .45 ACP cartridge, the externally similar Colt Ace was chambered for the far less powerful .22 LR cartridge. Accordingly, military, police, or civilian shooters could shoot the Ace without the recoil and expense of the 1911, but with similar ergonomics and sight picture. Except for the earliest models, the barrels of these guns are constructed with a hinged floating rear chamber that amplifies the recoil, cycling the heavy slide. 

The floating chamber can become fouled and stuck leading to poor feeding. When field stripping the Ace, the recoil spring is removed after removing the slide. The ejector may be removed before removing the barrel and the floating chamber must be aligned vertically to remove the barrel from the slide. Once the barrel is removed, the floating chamber can be rotated and separated from the main barrel for cleaning. When the extractor is replaced into the barrel, the back of the extractor should slide into the rear slot of the slide.

Users
 
 United States Navy: Used as a training pistol, designated the Pistol, Caliber .22, Colt, Service Ace (1950) and Pistol, Caliber .22 Colt, Ace (1960).

References

External links
 http://www.thedailytop.com/look-floating-chamber-recoil-booster-colt-ace-fascinating

Colt semi-automatic pistols
.22 LR pistols